King Xolilizwe KaZwelidumile (Mzikayise Sigcawu; 6 June 1926 – 31 December 2005) was the King of the Xhosa people from 10 April 1965 to 31 December 2005. King Xolilizwe was an active member of the National House of Traditional Leaders of South Africa. He was the oldest son of King Bungeni Zwelidumile Sigcawu.

Marriages and children
King Xolilizwe married five wives who produced five sons and six daughters.

1) Queen Nogaweni
 Prince Ahlangene Sigcawu (1970)
 Princess Bukelwa Sigcawu
 Princess Thobeka Sigcawu
 Princess Fila Sigcawu
2) Queen Nolusapho
 Prince Phandulwazi Sigcawu
3) Queen Nozamile of Iqadi
 Prince Zwelonke Sigcawu (1968)
 Prince Simpiwe Sigcawu
 Princess Vuyiswa Sigcawu
 Princess Nontathu Sigcawu
4) Queen Nolitha of Ixhiba (died 1988
5) Queen Nondwe (née Princess Seziwe Ndamase married July 1979)
 Prince Nondoda Sigcawu
 Princess NomaGcaleka Sigcawu

Death and funeral

King Xolilizwe died on the 31 December 2005 at No 1 Military Hospital in Pretoria and was buried on the 14 January 2006 at the Nqadu Great Palace near Willowvale, Eastern Cape with state funeral and royal funeral  and his funeral was attended by highly profiled politicians Premier of the Eastern Cape Nosimo Balindlela, General Bantu Holomisa and others, royal houses of abaThembu, amaMpondo, amaNdebele and other royal houses and guests including President Thabo Mbeki who made eulogy of Xolilizwe and amaRharhabe King Maxhob'ayakhawuleza Sandile who presided at the funeral.

He was succeeded by Zwelonke Sigcawu, the older son of the Iqadi house (3rd Queen).

References

External links 
 House of Sheba

Xhosa people
Rulers of the Gcaleka
1926 births
2005 deaths